West Coast Highway is an arterial coastal highway located in the western and inner northern suburbs of Perth, Western Australia. It is part of State Route 71, and also Tourist Drive 204 in various coastal parts.

The highway commences from the end of Curtin Avenue at Swanbourne and heads north, via the SAS Campbell Barracks and rifle range, to City Beach, Scarborough and Trigg, terminating at the Karrinyup Road intersection, where it becomes Marmion Avenue. It links the northern coastal suburbs of Perth with the city of Fremantle. The speed limit for the majority of the highway is 70 km/h with two small 60 and 80 km/h sections at the Scarborough  end. The highway is a dual carriageway for most of its length.

History

The highway began life as a minor coastal road (called Coast Road) between Swanbourne and North Beach in the 1940s. Prior to this time, the only access to settlements such as North Beach and Mullaloo had been by gravel road from Wanneroo Road. In the late 1960s, it was significantly upgraded and extended to Mullaloo Beach.

In the mid 1970s, the section through City Beach was redesigned, seeing the former Challenger Drive (inland) and West Coast Highway (coastal) trading names and the new highway being dualled as far north as Scarborough. The southernmost section running through Swanbourne was renamed Rochdale Road. In 1984, the highway was extended north to Ocean Reef Road.

By this stage, Marmion Avenue had supplanted the highway as the major road servicing the new northern suburbs, and suburban Swanbourne was struggling to cope with the through-traffic. In 1985-86, immediately preceding the designation of the State Route system, the highway immediately north of Scarborough was diverted inland along its present route to join Marmion Avenue at Karrinyup Road, and the highway south of City Beach was rerouted into Servetus Street, Swanbourne.

The northern two-thirds of the highway was divided up and renamed:

 West Coast Drive from Trigg to Hepburn Avenue and Hillarys Boat Harbour;
 Whitfords Avenue to Whitfords Avenue (east-west);
 Northshore Drive to Mullaloo Drive; and
 Oceanside Promenade to Ocean Reef Road.

Apart from the section in Scarborough, all of these sections were continuous.

By 2000, Servetus Street had become as much of a bottleneck as Rochdale Road had prior to 1985. A new extension to West Coast Highway, cut into the ground to reduce noise for local residents, was completed immediately next to Servetus Street, which was reduced to a local road. Curtin Avenue (leading to Fremantle) was also upgraded.

Major intersections
All intersections below are controlled by traffic signals unless otherwise mentioned.

See also

 Highways in Australia
 List of highways in Western Australia

References

Various UBD & Perth Metropolitan Street Directories - 1960s-1990s
Skyview WA - Department of Land Information, Western Australia

Highways and freeways in Perth, Western Australia